Sergey Nikolaevich Litvinov (23 January 1958 – 19 February 2018) was a Russian hammer thrower and athletics coach. He competed at the 1980 Summer Olympics and the 1988 Summer Olympics, missing the 1984 Summer Olympics due to the Soviet boycott, and won a silver and a gold medal, respectively. He also won two world titles, in 1983 and 1987. After retiring from competitions he coached elite hammer throwers including Ivan Tsikhan and his son Sergey.

Career
Throughout his career Litvinov battled with Yuriy Sedykh. Litvinov set three world records, the last being 84.14 metres in June 1983. However, Sedykh improved the world record to 86.34 m in 1984 and to 86.74 m at the 1986 European championships. In 1986 Litvinov threw 86.04 metres which remained his personal best. This result puts him second on the all-time performer's list, behind Sedykh. He also coached Ivan Tsikhan.

Litvinov finished second behind Sedykh and ahead of Jüri Tamm in the 1980 Summer Olympics. After missing the 1984 Games because of the Soviet boycott, he won the gold in 1988 ahead of Sedykh;  his throw of 84.80 m remains the Olympic record.

Litvinov's son Sergey is also an elite hammer thrower.

Death
Litvinov was reported to have died on 19 February 2018 in Sochi at the age of 60.  It was reported by Russia's athletics federation that he suddenly fell from his bicycle as he cycled home from a coaching session, and an ambulance crew was unable to revive him.

International competitions
Source

References

External links

1958 births
2018 deaths
People from Krasnodar Krai
Sportspeople from Krasnodar Krai
Soviet male hammer throwers
Russian male hammer throwers
Olympic male hammer throwers
Olympic athletes of the Soviet Union
Olympic gold medalists for the Soviet Union
Olympic gold medalists in athletics (track and field)
Olympic silver medalists for the Soviet Union
Olympic silver medalists in athletics (track and field)
Athletes (track and field) at the 1980 Summer Olympics
Athletes (track and field) at the 1988 Summer Olympics
Medalists at the 1980 Summer Olympics
Medalists at the 1988 Summer Olympics
Goodwill Games medalists in athletics
Competitors at the 1986 Goodwill Games
World Athletics Championships athletes for the Soviet Union
World Athletics Championships athletes for Russia
World Athletics Championships medalists
World Athletics Championships winners
IAAF Continental Cup winners
European Athletics Championships medalists
Soviet Athletics Championships winners
Russian Athletics Championships winners
Friendship Games medalists in athletics